Servais is a commune in the Aisne department in Picardy in northern France.

Servais may also refer to:
 Servais (given name)
 Servais Prize, a Luxembourgian literary award, awarded since 1992 
 Servais (surname)
 Servais Stradivarius, an antique cello crafted in 1701 by Italian luthier Antonio Stradivari of Cremona
 Saint-Servais (disambiguation)